The Third Symphony of Johannes Brahms has been popular since its premiere in 1883 and has been widely adapted in works of popular culture. The quotations predominantly are of the moody theme of the third movement.

The following list is organized chronologically.

In the 1946 film noir Undercurrent, starring Katharine Hepburn, the third-movement theme appears both in the opening credits and in multiple scenes.
The 1951 song "Take My Love" recorded and co-written by Frank Sinatra also uses the third-movement theme. Of the work, Kaplan writes, '"Take My Love," which turned a perfectly honest theme from Brahms's Third Symphony into an outright weeper, sold like the dog it was.'
In the 1952 film noir "Angel Face" (dir. Otto Preminger, produced by Howard Hughes, starring Jean Simmons and Robert Mitchum). Dmitry Tiomkin's score incorporated Brahms's 3rd movement as the main theme.
In the 1961 film Goodbye Again (also known as Aimez-vous Brahms?), starring Ingrid Bergman, the third movement theme is heard repeatedly, including as the tune of a song ("Say No More, It's Goodbye") sung by the night club singer (Diahann Carroll). A reviewer for the Illustrated London News wrote, "it insistently vulgarises and cheapens a theme from Brahms's Third Symphony".
The song "You'll love me yet" (track B3) on the studio album ′′Bach to the Blues′′ (1964) by the Ramsey Lewis Trio is a Jazz adaptation of the third movement.
In the show Fawlty Towers (1975-1979), Basil Fawlty, when accused by his wife of "listening to that racket", famously responds "Racket!? That's Brahms! Brahms's third racket!"
In 1983 Serge Gainsbourg wrote Baby Alone in Babylone for his ex-partner singer Jane Birkin, adopting Brahms's third movement theme as the main theme.
Robert Palmer album Pride 1983, ″Want You More″ melody line is from Brahms third movement.
In the 1987 film The Rosary Murders, the end credits music is an adaptation of the third movement. The song is titled "In Your Eyes" sung by Nancy Wood.
In 1991, Branford Marsalis paraphrased the main theme in the title track of his album The Beautyful Ones Not Yet Born, based on the novel by Ghanaian writer Ayi Kwei Armah.
In 1995, the popular anime Legend of the Galactic Heroes featured the third movement 'Poco Allegretto' in episode 83 ("After the festival") and in episode 94 ('Rebellion is a Hero's Privilege').
In the song When She's Gone by Eric XL Singleton Ft. Sinclair & Wilde (1997) the theme from the symphony was used in the refrain.
Carlos Santana used the third-movement theme in his song "Love of My Life," (Ft. Dave Matthews), from the album Supernatural (1999), although he does not credit Brahms.
In the 2003 Hong Kong crime film Infernal Affairs II, the third-movement theme was used in the ending scene, which shows the crowd toasting to Hon Sam during the Hong Kong handover.
The 2005 film Factotum (based on the novel by Charles Bukowski) uses the symphony as part of the soundtrack.
The 2005 computer game Civilization IV uses the symphony as part of the soundtrack for the Industrial Age.  See Music in the Civilization video game series.
In 2007 the third-movement theme was used in the introduction of Stevie Wonder's "Part-Time Lover" music video as background music in a television playing Back Street (1961 film).
In 2011 French film "The Art of Love" it was used as the main title music
In 2012 a theme from the symphony was used by the Russian gymnast Anastasia Grishina as her floor music at the London 2012 Olympic Games.
In the 2013 film Kill Your Darlings, the third movement theme is used three times: twice in original full orchestra scoring and once in piano transcription. The second instance is used as source music: Lucien Carr is playing it on a record player in his Columbia dorm room, and Allen Ginsberg hearing it from his own room goes to track it down.
The main musical theme of the "Liquidation Series" (2007) is partially borrowed from the 3rd movement of the Symphony — Poco allegretto (this was noted at the Russian Silver Galosha Award-2009, in the nomination "For Plagiarism of the Year"

References

Anon. (1947) Review of Goodman, Undercurrent (audio recording). Billboard, Apr. 12, 1947.
Epstein, Josh (2014) Sublime Noise: Musical Culture and the Modernist Writer.  Baltimore:  JHU Press.
Kaplan, James (2011) Frank: The Voice.  Anchor. Excerpts on line at Google Books: .

Symphonies by Johannes Brahms